Tomás Joaquín de Acosta y Pérez de Guzmán (December 29, 1800February 21, 1852) was a Colombian explorer, historian, chorographer, and geologist.

A native of Colombia in South America, he served in the Colombian army and in 1834 attempted a scientific survey of the territory between Socorro and the Magdalena River. Seven years later he explored western Colombia from Antioquia to Anserma studying its topography, its natural history and the traces of its aboriginal inhabitants.

In 1845 he went to Spain to examine such documentary material concerning Colombia and its colonial history as was then accessible, and three years later he published his Compendio, a work on the discovery and colonization of New Granada (Colombia). The map accompanying this work, now out of date, was very fair for the time, and the work itself is still valuable for its abundant bibliographic references and biographic notes. What he says in it of the writings of Gonzalo Jiménez de Quesada the conqueror of New Granada, is very incomplete and in many ways erroneous, but his biographies remain a guide to the student of Spanish-American history. One year after the Compendio, another work called Semenario appeared at Paris, embodying the botanical papers of Francisco José de Caldas.

Personal life 
He was the son of Josef Acosta and Soledad Pérez de Guzman and married Caroline Kemble Rowe. His daughter Soledad Acosta de Samper, born May 5, 1833, became a historian and writer and married José María Samper, Colombian lawyer, writer and politician.

Selected works

References

External links 

 Appleton's Cyclopedia of American Biography, edited by James Grant Wilson, John Fiske and Stanley L. Klos. Six volumes, New York: D. Appleton and Company, 1887-1889 

1799 births
1852 deaths
People from Guaduas
Colombian explorers
Colombian geologists
19th-century Colombian historians
Colombian military personnel
Muisca scholars